Alejandro “Álex” Jiménez García (born 13 January 2002) is a Spanish-born Dominican professional footballer who plays as a centre back for the Dominican Republic national team.

International career
Jiménez's mother is Dominican. He first represented the Dominican Republic at under–17 in 2019. He made his senior international debut in 2021.

References

2002 births
Living people
Citizens of the Dominican Republic through descent
Dominican Republic footballers
Association football central defenders
Dominican Republic international footballers
Footballers from Terrassa
Spanish footballers
UE Cornellà players
Spanish people of Dominican Republic descent
Sportspeople of Dominican Republic descent